Anthony Cope was a seventeenth-century Irish Anglican priest.
 

Cope was educated at Trinity College, Dublin. He was Archdeacon of Elphin from 1669 to 1670; Prebendary of Killaraght in Achonry Cathedral from 1673 to 1693; Dean of Elphin from 1683 to 1700; and Prebendary of Rasharkin in Lisburn Cathedral from 1700 until his death in 1705.

References 

Deans of Elphin
Archdeacons of Elphin
17th-century Irish Anglican priests
18th-century Irish Anglican priests
1705 deaths